"I'd Do Anything" is a song by Canadian rock band Simple Plan. It was released on September 16, 2002, as the second single from their debut album, No Pads, No Helmets...Just Balls. It features vocals from Mark Hoppus.

Content
The song is about a relationship breakup and the singer's attempts to get the person back.

Chart performance
On the US Billboard Hot 100, "I'd Do Anything" peaked at number 51. It also charted on the Billboard Mainstream Top 40 chart, where it reached number 15. Internationally, the song reached number 78 in the United Kingdom and number 92 in Australia.

Music video
The music video for the song revolves around kids trying to get into a Simple Plan concert by first impressing the doorman. Mark Hoppus is also featured in the video.

Track listing
 "I'd Do Anything" (album version)
 "I'm Just a Kid" (single version)
 "Grow Up"
 "My Christmas List"
 "I'm Just a Kid" (enhanced video)

Charts

Certifications

Release history

References

2001 songs
2002 singles
Lava Records singles
Simple Plan songs
Songs written by Pierre Bouvier
Songs written by Chuck Comeau
Songs written by Arnold Lanni
Songs written by Sébastien Lefebvre
Songs written by Jeff Stinco